John Hayes (15 March 1907 – 13 April 1971) was an Australian rules footballer who played with Footscray in the Victorian Football League (VFL).

Family
The son of John Hayes, and Ellen Hayes, née Morrissey, John Hayes was born at Newtown, New South Wales on 15 March 1907.

Football

South Sydney AFC
He played with the South Sydney Australian Football Club for six seasons (1925–1930).

Footscray (VFL)
Cleared from South Sydney in March 1931, he played in 13 matches for the Footscray First XVIII in 1931.

St George AFC
Cleared from Footscray on 20 April 1932, he returned to Sydney and played with the St George Australian Football Club for four seasons (1932–1935).

Military service
He enlisted in the Second AIF  on 10 December 1941.

Death
He died at the Concord Repatriation General Hospital on 13 April 1971,.

See also
 1927 Melbourne Carnival
 1930 Adelaide Carnival

Notes

References
 
 World War Two Nominal Roll: Private John Hayes (NX77818), Department of Veterans' Affairs.
 B883, VX77818: World War Two Service Record: Private John Hayes (NX77818), National Archives of Australia.
 Jack Hayes, NSW Australian Football History Society.

External links 

1907 births
1971 deaths
Australian rules footballers from New South Wales
South Sydney Football Club players
Western Bulldogs players
St George AFC players
Australian Army personnel of World War II
Australian Army soldiers